The 2005–06 Texas A&M Aggies men's basketball team represented Texas A&M University during the 2005–06 NCAA Division I men's basketball season. The team was led by head coach Billy Gillispie, and played their home games at Reed Arena in College Station, Texas as a member of the Big 12 Conference.

Recruiting

Players

Roster

Source:

Schedule

|-
!colspan=9| Regular season

|-
!colspan=9| Postseason

Source:

References

External links
Official website

Texas A&M Aggies men's basketball seasons
Texas AandM
Texas AandM